Phyllodesmium magnum is a species of sea slug, an aeolid nudibranch, a marine gastropod mollusc in the family Facelinidae.

Distribution 
This species was described from New Caledonia with additional material from NW Australia, the Marshall Islands and Hong Kong. The distribution of Phyllodesmium magnum includes North Kermadec and Guam.

Description 
This species grows to 130 mm in length. It is one of the Phyllodesmium species which contain zooxanthellae.

Ecology 
Phyllodesmium magnum feeds on a soft coral Sinularia sp.

References

Facelinidae
Gastropods described in 1991